= Bodybuilding in Thailand =

- Country: Thailand
- National team: Thailand

Bodybuilding in Thailand includes Thai competitors representing their country at international events. Thai Bodybuilding Federation is the sport's national governing body.

== History ==
Thailand sent a team to the 2014 Asian Beach Games. Thailand was scheduled to send a bodybuilding team to the 2014 Southeast Asian Games.

== Governance ==
Thai Bodybuilding Federation is the sport's national governing body, and is a recognized by the International Federation of Bodybuilding and Fitness as the national federation, representing the country's bodybuilding community. The national federation is also a member of the Asian Bodybuilding and Physique Sports Federation.
